Red Earth Creek Airport  is located near to Red Earth Creek, Alberta, Canada.

References

Registered aerodromes in Alberta
Municipal District of Opportunity No. 17